Alan William Gilbertson (6 December 1927 – 7 May 2009) was a New Zealand cricketer. He played eight first-class matches for Otago between 1951 and 1954.

Gilbertson was born at Invercargill in Southland in 1927, the son of James Gilbertson and nephew of John Gilbertson, both of whom had played first-class cricket for Southland. Like his father, he worked as a builder. He set a seventh wicket record partnership of 182 runs for Otago, batting with Bert Sutcliffe in 1952–53.

References

External links
 

1927 births
2009 deaths
New Zealand cricketers
Otago cricketers
Cricketers from Invercargill